Arlen Siu Bermúdez (15 July 1955 – 1 August 1975) was a singer-songwriter, essayist and Sandinista revolutionary, who became one of the first casualties during the insurrection against Somoza.

Early life
Arlen Siu was born on 15 July 1955 in Jinotepe, Nicaragua. Her father, Armando Siu Lau, was born in Guangdong, China, and immigrated to Nicaragua in the late 1940s after serving in the Communist Revolutionary Army. He later married a Nicaraguan woman. Arlen Siu attended La Escuela Normal de Señoritas (Young Women's Normal School) in Jinotepe and UNAN, where she often sang with Marlene Álvarez, a member of the band Grupo Pancasán.

Career
Siu was 18 when she joined the Sandinistas. She had already attained a level of national celebrity as a talented songwriter, singer, and guitarist by the time she joined the movement. She was killed on 1 August 1975, during an ambush near El Sauce, Leon, Nicaragua, by soldiers from Anastasio Somoza Debayle's National Guard. She was 20 years old.

Many in Nicaragua consider Siu one of the earliest deaths in the revolutionary movement. Her artistic works and critical essays on Marxism and feminism served as an inspiration to both the Sandinistas and the Nicaraguan women's movement. Her picture was often displayed at FSLN celebrations throughout Nicaragua. Managua and El Rama have neighborhoods named after her, and a park in León is also named after her.

Siu wrote a song called "Maria Rural", and since her death it has been sung by Álvarez and Grupo Pancasán, among others.

References

External links
 Famous Nicaraguans

1955 births
1975 deaths 
1975 crimes in Nicaragua 
1975 murders in North America
1970s  murders in Nicaragua
Nicaraguan women writers
Nicaraguan revolutionaries
Assassinated Nicaraguan people
Nicaraguan people of Chinese descent
Nicaraguan communists
People murdered in Nicaragua
20th-century Nicaraguan women singers
People of the Nicaraguan Revolution
20th-century Nicaraguan women writers
20th-century Nicaraguan writers
Communist women writers
Nicaraguan socialist feminists
People from Carazo Department
National Autonomous University of Nicaragua alumni
Nicaraguan feminists
Nicaraguan women activists